Pacem School is an independent alternative middle and high school in Montpelier, Vermont.

History and overview
The school was founded in 2006 to provide classes and resources to local home-schooled students. In 2012, the school became a State of Vermont Recognized School and admitted its first full-time students. In 2015, the school gained status as an Approved Independent school.

Academics and philosophy
The school's name, Pacem, means “peace” in Latin. In keeping with this, the school is governed using the sociocratic decision-making process. In addition, students are taught to use conflict resolution strategies and are encouraged to participate in community events.

References

2006 establishments in Vermont
High schools in Vermont
Middle schools in Vermont
Education in Montpelier, Vermont
Schools in Washington County, Vermont